Diaphus dehaveni is a species of lanternfish found in the Philippines and the Western Central Pacific Ocean.

Etymology
The fish is named in honor of the Isaac Norris De Haven (1847-1924), a birder and a sportsman from Philadelphia, Pennsylvania, for whom Fowler was thankful for the many local fishes that De Haven

References

Myctophidae
Taxa named by Henry Weed Fowler
Fish described in 1934